Mechanics' Institute is a historic membership library, cultural event center, and chess club housed at 57 Post Street, San Francisco, California. It was founded in 1854 as a mechanics' institute, an educational and cultural institution to serve the vocational needs of out-of-work gold miners. Today the Institute serves readers, writers, downtown employees, students, film lovers, chess players, and others in search of learning and a community for the exchange of ideas.

History
In 1848, the discovery of gold lured people from all over the world to California.  By 1853 most surface gold was mined out, pushing the town of San Francisco into economic decline. A flood of former miners had no employment and no skills nor prospects. Mechanics' Institute began in 1854 with four books, a chess and games room, and a mission to start a vocational school. At this time, California had no colleges or universities and no public libraries. (The San Francisco Public Library did not open until 1879.)

By March 1857, Mechanics' Institute of San Francisco elected the following officers: President John Sime, Vice President Gardner Elliot, Secretary H. F. Williams, and Treasurer J. E. Kinkade.

Within a few years, Mechanics' Institute offered classes in such subjects as woodworking, mechanical drawing, industrial design, electrical science, applied mathematics, and ironwork.  The Institute's importance in technical education in California reached a pinnacle in 1868 when the California legislature granted a charter for the establishment of the University of California.  The Institute participated in the fledgling university's first years, hosting technical classes and presenting lectures on many topics. Members of Mechanics' Institute helped develop the university curriculum and had continuously held a seat on the Board of Regents until 1974.

Aside from educational endeavors, the Institute also promoted industry in the San Francisco Bay Area.  Beginning in 1857, on land donated by land baron James Lick, the Institute hosted industrial fairs that displayed inventions, art, and products of all kinds to thousands of visitors.  Awards were presented to winning exhibitors—many of whom are still in business today, including Levi Strauss, Singer Sewing Machines, Goodyear Tire, Boudin Bakery, Heald Business College, Gump's, and Ghirardelli Chocolate.

Mechanics' Institute purchased the site on Post Street, between Montgomery and Kearny, in 1866 where the Institute erected a three-story building designed by William Patton. The new building featured retail spaces on the ground floor, a library with open stacks, a lecture hall for about six hundred people, a chess room, a furnished ladies' sitting room, and other rooms for rental by committees, lodges, and related scientific organizations.

President Theodore Roosevelt gave an address at the institute on 13 May 1903.

Library

Initially a library dedicated to the mechanical arts, the Institute merged with the Mercantile Library Association and dropped its technical focus in 1906. Its current collection of 200,000 items, housed in an historical marble and wrought iron two-story library covers all subjects, with special strengths in literature, arts, history, philosophy, business, finance, and hard-to-find periodicals. Two focal areas are the chess books and local history collections. Mechanics' Institute also has substantial non-print resources, such as the audio-book, e-book, and a music collection as well as database access online to film libraries, geneological searches, financial databases and more.

Events
The Mechanics' Institute events department presents over fifty author events a year. These offer a broad spectrum of authors and themes, including fiction and non-fiction, with an emphasis on American and world history, arts and architecture, biography, science and technology, social trends, economy, and culinary arts.  Special Programs, such as the San Francisco Noir Literary Night, World Poetry Reading, Bloomsday, and a Bastille Day celebration are popular annual events.

The CinemaLit Film Series presents 35 films a year, featuring classic American, retro and foreign films. The evening begins with introductions by prominent film critics, writers, and reviewers, with a discussion after each film. CinemaLit draws an eclectic, diverse audience with many film buffs dedicated to the Friday night film salon.

Author events, CinemaLit and Special Programs are open to members and the public. Free attendance at most events and CinemaLit are a benefit of membership.

Conferences
In November 2016, the institute hosted Reinvention: Thriving in the 21st Century - Mechanics' Worldwide, the fourth in a series of international conferences for "independent and subscription libraries, mechanics' institutes, athenaeums, societies, literary institutes, lyceums, mercantile libraries, schools of arts and working men's institutes".

Chess

The Mechanics' Institute building houses the oldest continuously operating chess club in the United States, the Mechanics' Institute Chess Club. Many world champions have visited the chess room, from Emanuel Lasker in 1902 to Boris Spassky in 2006.  In 2009 one of the chess club's young students, 12-year-old Daniel Naroditsky, won the World Championship for his age group.  The chess club offers tournaments and other activities for all player levels.

Membership
Membership in the Mechanics' Institute is open to the public, and offers use of the library and chess room, free admittance or discounts to special events, lectures, book discussion groups, classes, and other activities.

See also
 A. W. Piper, Seattle confectioner and politician, trained at the Mechanics' Institute in 1857
 List of San Francisco Designated Landmarks

References

Further reading
 J. Cumming, Theory made practice: the story of the undertaking and development of the Mechanics’ Institute of San Francisco. Sunset Magazine 19:1 (May 1907) 43–50.
 Hildie V. Kraus. A cultural history of the Mechanics' Institute of San Francisco, 1855–1920. Library History 23, June 2007
Chris VerPlanck, The Mechanics’ Institute Library, Commission and Construction: 1906-1912

External links

Chess clubs in the United States
Clubs and societies in California
Libraries in San Francisco
Mechanics' Institute
1854 establishments in California
Mechanics
San Francisco Designated Landmarks
Adult education in the United States